Treubiomyces is a genus of fungi in the family Chaetothyriaceae.

The genus was circumscribed by Franz Xaver Rudolf von Höhnel in Sitzungsber. Kaiserl. Akad. Wiss., Math.-Naturwiss. Cl., Abt. 1, 118: 1180 in 1909.

The genus name of Treubiomyces is in honour of Melchior Treub (1851–1910), who was a Dutch botanist. He worked at the Bogor Botanical Gardens in Buitenzorg on the island of Java, south of Batavia, Dutch East Indies, gaining renown for his work on tropical flora.

Species
As accepted by Species Fungorum;
Treubiomyces celastri 
Treubiomyces citri 
Treubiomyces funtumiae 
Treubiomyces japonicus 
Treubiomyces pacificus 
Treubiomyces pulcherrimus 
Treubiomyces roseosporus

References

Eurotiomycetes
Eurotiomycetes genera